Floyd County is a county located in the northwestern part of the U.S. state of Georgia. As of the 2020 United States Census, the population was 98,584. The county seat is Rome.

Floyd County comprises the Rome, GA metropolitan statistical area.

History
The county was established on December 3, 1832, by an act of the Georgia General Assembly, and was created from land that was part of Cherokee County at the time. The county is named after United States Congressman John Floyd.

Geography

The northern third of Floyd County is located in the Oostanaula River sub-basin of the ACT River Basin (Coosa-Tallapoosa River Basin). The eastern third of the county is located in the Etowah River sub-basin of the larger ACT River Basin, while the western third of Floyd County is located in the Upper Coosa River sub-basin of the same ACT River Basin.

Lakes and reservoirs

 Antioch Lake
 Lake Conasauga
 DeSoto Lake
 Heath Lake
 Lake Marvin
 Powers Lake
 Weiss Lake

Adjacent counties
 Walker County – north
 Gordon County – northeast
 Bartow County – east
 Polk County – south
 Cherokee County, Alabama – west (CST)
 Chattooga County – northwest

National protected area
 Chattahoochee National Forest (part)

Transportation

Major highways

  U.S. Route 27
  U.S. Route 411
  State Route 1
  State Route 1 Loop
  State Route 20
  State Route 53
  State Route 100
  State Route 101
  State Route 140
  State Route 156
  State Route 293

Pedestrians and cycling

 Heritage Trail System
 Kingfisher Trail
 Silver Creek Trail
 Simms Mountain Trail
 Snow Loop
 The Goat
 Thornwood Trail
 Viking Trail

Demographics

2000 census
As of the 2000 United States Census,  90,565 people, 34,028 households, and 24,227 were families living in the county.  The population density was 176 people per square mile (68/km2).  The 36,615 housing units averaged 71 per square mile (28/km2).  The racial makeup of the county was 81.34% White, 13.31% African American, 0.31% Native American, 0.93% Asian, 0.09% Pacific Islander, 2.88% from other races, and 1.14% from two or more races. About 5.50% of the population was Hispanic or Latino of any race.

Of the 34,028 households, 32.10% had children under the age of 18 living with them, 53.60% were married couples living together, 13.00% had a female householder with no husband present, and 28.80% were non-families. 24.50% of all households were made up of individuals, and 10.80% had someone living alone who was 65 years of age or older.  The average household size was 2.55, and the average family size was 3.02.

In the county, the population was distributed as 24.60% under the age of 18, 10.80% from 18 to 24, 28.50% from 25 to 44, 22.20% from 45 to 64, and 13.90% who were 65 years of age or older. The median age was 36 years. For every 100 females, there were 93.80 males. For every 100 females age 18 and over, there were 90.30 males.

The median income for a household in the county was $35,615, and for a family was $42,302. Males had a median income of $31,659 versus $23,244 for females. The per capita income for the county was $17,808.  About 10.80% of families and 14.40% of the population were below the poverty line, including 19.40% of those under age 18 and 13.80% of those age 65 or over.

2010 census
As of the 2010 United States Census, 96,317 people, 35,930 households, and 24,916 families were living in the county. The racial makeup of the county was 76.9% White, 14.2% African American, 1.3% Asian, 0.4% American Indian, 0.1% Pacific Islander, 5.3% from other races, and 1.9% from two or more races. Those of Hispanic or Latino origin made up 9.3% of the population. In terms of ancestry, 16.2% were English, 13.3% were American, 12.4% were Irish, and 6.8% were German.

Of the 35,930 households, 34.4% had children under the age of 18 living with them, 49.4% were married couples living together, 14.8% had a female householder with no husband present, 30.7% were not families; 26.0% of all households were made up of individuals. The average household size was 2.58, and the average family size was 3.09. The median age was 37.6 years.

Males had a median income of $40,269 versus $29,587 for females. The per capita income for the county was $20,640. About 13.3% of families and 18.7% of the population were below the poverty line, including 26.5% of those under age 18 and 11.0% of those age 65 or over.

2020 census

As of the 2020 United States census, there were 98,584 people, 35,443 households, and 23,561 families residing in the county.

Government
The county government is housed in the Floyd County Administration Building in Rome, Georgia, the county seat. This was the former US Post Office and Courthouse.

The county has a council-manager form of government, with five county council members elected at-large. Two members are elected as representatives of the city of Rome and must reside there; the other three are elected from the county as residents outside the city limits. The at-large voting tends to reward candidates who can muster majority votes from across the whole county, which requires more money and organization for campaigns. The council hires a professional county manager to manage daily operations.

Education

Colleges and universities 
 Berry College
 Shorter University
 Georgia Highlands College

Primary and secondary schools 
Floyd County School District operates schools in most of the county. Its high schools are Armuchee High School, Coosa High School, Model High School, and Pepperell High School.

Rome City School District serves areas in the Rome city limits. Rome High School is its high school.

 Private schools
 Unity Christian School 
 Darlington School
 St. Mary's Catholic School (of the Roman Catholic Archdiocese of Atlanta)
 Berry College Elementary & Middle School
 Montessori School of Rome

Law enforcement
The Bob Richards Regional Youth Detention Center, part of the Georgia Department of Juvenile Justice, is in Rome.

 the Floyd County Sheriff's Office employs 162 people. The current Floyd County Jail was built in 1982 and renovated in 1996. It is the largest building owned by the county government, being 256 thousand square feet in area. In 2020, the jail's average daily population was 507 inmates.

Notable people 

 Linda Anderson, according to NPR considered "one of the foremost living memory painters".

Communities

Cities
 Cave Spring
 Rome

Census-designated places
 Berry College
 Lindale
 Shannon

Unincorporated communities
 Armuchee
 Coosa
 Livingston
 Mount Berry
 Silver Creek

See also 

 National Register of Historic Places listings in Floyd County, Georgia
 Berry College
List of counties in Georgia

References

External links
 Floyd County Government Online
 Floyd County historical marker

 
1832 establishments in Georgia (U.S. state)
Populated places established in 1832
Georgia (U.S. state) counties
Northwest Georgia (U.S.)
Counties of Appalachia